RV Andromedae is a variable star in the constellation of Andromeda.  It is classified as a semiregular variable pulsating giant star, and varies from an apparent visual magnitude of 11.5 at minimum brightness to a magnitude of 9.0 at maximum brightness, with a period of approximately 168.9 days.

This is one of the Mira variables where mode switching of pulsations have been observed; amplitude and periods have been seen decreasing and subsequently increasing back to values near the previous ones.

References

Semiregular variable stars
Andromeda (constellation)
M-type giants
Andromedae, RV
010192
Durchmusterung objects